Steps in the Scientific Tradition: Readings in the History of Science is a 1968 anthology edited by Richard S. Westfall and Victor E. Thoren.

Summary
The book is an anthology of primary source readings. The editors provide biographical sketches and commentary. Authors included are:

Aristotle
Ptolemy
Lucretius
Roger Bacon
Jean Buridan
Galileo Galilei
William Harvey
René Descartes
Isaac Newton
Benjamin Franklin
Antoine Lavoisier
John Playfair
Thomas Young
Sadi Carnot
Theodor Schwann
Charles Darwin
J. J. Thomson
Thomas Hunt Morgan
Irving Langmuir

Background and publication history
Richard S. Westfall (1924–1996) was a historian of the scientific revolution. He wrote Never at Rest: A Biography of Isaac Newton (1980) and several other books. Victor E. Thoren (1935–1991) was a historian of astronomy and the author of The Lord of Uraniborg: A Biography of Tycho Brahe (1990). The two were colleagues in the department of History and Philosophy of Science at Indiana University.

Steps in the Scientific Tradition was first published in 1968 by John Wiley & Sons, Inc.

Reception
Steps in the Scientific Tradition received a positive review from Clifford Maier in Isis, a mixed review from Frank Greenaway in Nature, and a negative review from Science Books: A Quarterly Review.

Maier wrote that, as a source book for an introductory course in the history of science, Steps in the Scientific Tradition "has distinct advantages over most others readily available in English": longer readings rather than short excerpts, presented in an order that "may well provoke in a student a sense of the development of the changing scientific patterns of thought".

Greenaway reviewed Steps in the Scientific Tradition alongside The Science of Matter: a Historical Survey, edited by Maurice P. Crosland. He considered the Westfall and Thoren book less suitable than the Crosland book for use as a textbook. He wrote that, while it may be "an excellent thing" for a student to read historically important passages such as the thirty-first query in Newton's Opticks, the note introducing each passage "only sketches lightly the intellectual situation in respect of one problem or contemporary question". He suggested that the editors ought to have provided explanation for their choice of passages and other guidance to teachers.

Science Books: A Quarterly Review rated the book "Not Recommended". The reviewer found the introductory notes "superficial and perfunctory" and the quality of the translations "deplorable". The reviewer wrote, "It is wholly unnecessary that a student read Ptolemy or Descartes in cumbersome mid-19th century British English, as presented in this book."

References

Sources

1968 books
Wiley (publisher) books
Books about the history of science